Hysterocladia is a genus of moths in the family Megalopygidae.

Species
Hysterocladia conjuncta Hopp, 1927
Hysterocladia corallocera Felder, 1874
Hysterocladia elongata Hopp, 1927
Hysterocladia eriphua Dognin, 1914
Hysterocladia ferecostata Hopp, 1927
Hysterocladia latiunca Hopp, 1927
Hysterocladia lena (Schaus, 1912)
Hysterocladia mirabilis (Schaus, 1905)
Hysterocladia primigenia Hopp, 1927
Hysterocladia roseicollis Dognin, 1914
Hysterocladia roseicollis vicina Hopp, 1927
Hysterocladia servilis Hopp, 1927
Hysterocladia tolimensis Hopp, 1927
Hysterocladia unimana Hopp, 1943
Hysterocladia werneri Hopp, 1927

References

Megalopygidae
Megalopygidae genera